Monogatari is a Japanese light novel series written by Nisio Isin and illustrated by Vofan. The plot centers around Koyomi Araragi, a third-year high school student who survives a vampire attack and subsequently finds himself helping girls involved with a variety of apparitions, ghosts, beasts, spirits, and other supernatural phenomena.

T‌he series began as three short stories serialized in Kodansha's Mephisto magazine between the September 2005 and May 2006 issues, which were later collected in a light novel volume published in Japan on November 2, 2006. Kodansha released 28 volumes in the series under its Kodansha Box imprint. Each of the 28 entries in the series share the common title suffix . T‌he novels are licensed in North America by Vertical, which began publishing its English paperback release of the series in December 2015 with the prequel arc Kizumonogatari. 

Nisio Isin has also penned a number of short short stories and other related works set in the same fictional universe.

Volume lists

Japanese volume list

English volume list

Audiobook
The English audiobook version of Kizumonogatari was released on May 25, 2016 by Bang Zoom! Entertainment with narration done by Keith Silverstein, Eric Kimerer, and Cristina Vee. The audiobook for Nekomonogatari (White) was released on April 9, 2019 with narration done by Cristina Vee, Eric Kimerer, and Erica Mendez. The audiobook for the three volumes of Bakemonogatari were released on March 24, 2020 with narration done by Eric Kimerer, Cristina Vee, Erica Mendez, and Keith Silverstein.

The Japanese audiobook versions of the entire series have starting release by Kodansha via Audible since February 17, 2021. Each novel features narration by the voice actors/actresses of the anime adaptation. One novel will be released each month until June 16, 2023 with the second volume of Shinomonogatari.

List of short short stories

Mazemonogatari
 is a collection of short stories featuring characters from Nisio Isin's other works. Twelve of these stories were first distributed in Japanese cinemas during the Japanese theatrical releases of Kizumonogatari Part 1: Tekketsu, Kizumonogatari Part 2: Nekketsu  and Kizumonogatari Part 3: Reiketsu.  A collected volume of these stories, alongside three previously unpublished ones, was published by Kodansha on February 6, 2019.

Other related works
, released on August 4, 2009.
 - Ōgi's challenge to the readers published as part of the serialization of Ōgi Formula in Bessatsu Shonen Magazine, October 2013 issue, released on September 9, 2013.
, included in the special edition of volume 12 of March Comes in like a Lion, released on September 29, 2016.
, released on February 22, 2023, as part of the celebration of Nisio Isin's 20-year career.

Notes

References

External links
Official Monogatari series page  at Kodansha Box 

Monogatari (series)
Nisio Isin
Lists of light novels
Novel series